Cleveland–Redland Bay Road is a continuous  road route in the Redland local government area of Queensland, Australia. The route is designated as part of State Route 47.
It is a state-controlled district road (number 109) rated as a local road of regional significance (LRRS).

Route description
It runs south as Waterloo Street, crossing two roundabouts before turning east on Russell Street. It then turns south on Bloomfield Street. As it crosses South Street and enters  the name changes to Cleveland–Redland Bay Road.

Continuing through Thornlands it turns south-east and passes the exit to Redland Bay Road (Boundary Road) as it approaches the southern boundary (Eprapah Creek). Soon after entering  it passes the exit to Colburn Avenue. From there the road continues south and south-east into , where it again turns south before turning south-east to its end at an intersection with Beenleigh-Redland Bay Road (Serpentine Creek Road).

Land use along the road is mainly residential, with a small area of rural on the western side in Redland Bay.

Road condition
The road is fully sealed, with several short sections of four-lane dual carriageway. A project to upgrade sections of the road, at a cost of $110 million, was in construction in late 2021.

History

Cleveland was surveyed in 1840, and was recommended for development as a port in 1841. In 1847 a navigation beacon was installed and a new town was planned. In 1850 Cleveland was proclaimed a township, but in 1852 it lost any chance of becoming a major port, although the navigation beacon was replaced by a lighthouse in 1864. The town became the commercial centre for the surrounding area, with timber cutting and farming being the main industries.

Thornlands was originally part of Cleveland. It was made available for settlement by small farmers from 1858.

The Redland Bay region was settled from the 1860s, first by timber cutters and then by farmers. Cotton was the first crop, but was unsuccessful and soon replaced by sugar cane. The first roads from north to south were made by timber cutters to enable transport of their product to market.

Major intersections
All distances are from Google Maps. The entire road is within the Redland local government area.

See also

 List of road routes in Queensland
 List of numbered roads in Queensland

Notes

References

Roads in Queensland